is a women's volleyball team based in Himeji, Japan. The owner of the team is Masayoshi Manabe, former Head Coach of the Japan women's national volleyball team. The club was founded in 2016.

Himeji entered the V.League in 2018 playing in V.League Division 2 and won the 2018-2019 season Championship which automatically promoted them to Japan's top level V.League Division 1.

History
The team registered with the Japan Volleyball association in March 2016. Three months later Yoshie Takeshita was announced as head coach. In November 2016 Masayoshi Manabe, who was born in Himeji, was appointed General Manager.

In July 2017, Himeji announced it would transfer the franchise of bankrupt club Sendai Belle Fille to Himeji Victorina, with a requirement that it take 8 of the players from Sendai Belle Fille and reach contract agreements with them. If successful it would be the first time in Japan that one club team had transferred to another. The team's goal was to enter the V.Challenge League II for the 2017-2018 season. By August 3rd Himeji had reached an agreement with only two Sendai players. On August 10 the V.League announced Himeji had been unable to sign a sufficient number of Sendai players and would not be allowed to participate in the V.Challenge League II 2017-18 season.

In March 2018 the Japanese V.League announced Himeji Victorina will play the 2018–2019 season in the newly organized V.League Division 2

On March 17, 2019, Himeji Victorina defeated JA Gifu Rioreina in straight sets to claim the title of Women's V.League Division 2 Champions. As 2018-2019 V2 Champions they are automatically promoted to play the 2019-2020 season in  V.League Division 1.

Masayoshi Manabe is currently the team owner and Kiyoshi Abo is the team's General Manager.

Honors
 V.League Division 2
Champions (1): 2018-2019
Runners-up:

League results

Current squad
2021-22 Squad as of 13 December - 2021

 Head coach:  Kodai Nakaya

Former players

Domestic Players

 Mihoko Tsutsui (2018-2019)
 Yuki Kawai (2018-2019)
 Sakie Takahashi (ja) (2018–2020)
 Kyoko Katashita (2018–2020)
 Rie Takaki (2018–2020)
 Yuko Asazu (2018–2020)
 Haruka Kojima (2019–2020) Transferred to staff
 Yuka Kanasugi (2018–2021)
 Yurika Mizoguchi (2018–2021) Transferred to Prestige International

Foreign Players
  
 Suelle Oliveira (2018-2019)
  Ivna Colombo (2019-2020)
 
 Aliona Martiniuc (2020–2021)

References

External links
Club Home Page

Japanese volleyball teams
2016 establishments in Japan
Volleyball clubs established in 2016
Sport in Himeji